Mushtaq Gazdar (1940 – 15 November 2000) was a Pakistani cinematographer, who scripted, directed and produced around 190 short feature films, documentary films and newsreels on subjects including poverty-stricken women, especially those abused, bought and sold in open flesh markets as well as helpless children.

Early life and career
Mushtaq Gazdar was born in 1940 in Karachi. He did his MSc. degree in physics from the University of Karachi. He held diplomas in film-making technique from London and Tokyo, and founded his own production house in Karachi. He also worked as Production Assistant  with the UK-based TV film mini-series, the Emmy Award winner Traffik (1989).

He was a founding member of the Human Rights Commission of Pakistan. He also wrote articles on social issues for newspapers. Mushtaq Gazdar personally had politically progressive ideology and associated with people like Faiz Ahmed Faiz, Sibte Hassan and Dorab Patel.

He also wrote a voluminous book Pakistani Cinema: 1947-1997, a historical and critical study of Pakistan's film industry, published in 1997 to commemorate Pakistan's 50th anniversary. Before he suddenly died on 15 November 2000, he was elected the honorary secretary of the Pakistan Arts Council, Karachi.

Family
Mushtaq Gazdar was married to Saeeda Gazdar, a short story writer and a poet, and they had a son and a daughter. His daughter, Aisha Gazdar, worked with her father and became a short documentary film maker in Pakistan in 2010.

Books
Pakistan Cinema (1947-1997)  by Mushtaq Gazdar (published in 1997, Oxford University Press)

Awards and recognition
Pride of Performance Award by the President of Pakistan in 1990
 Won 2 Nigar Awards for his short documentary films

References

1940 births
2000 deaths
Pakistani cinematographers
Film directors from Karachi
Muhajir people
University of Karachi alumni
Recipients of the Pride of Performance
Nigar Award winners
Pakistani documentary film directors